National Bank of Abu Dhabi (NBAD) was a bank operating in the United Arab Emirates (UAE) until it merged with the First Gulf Bank in December 2016 to form First Abu Dhabi Bank. NBAD was the largest lender bank in the Emirate of Abu Dhabi and in the United Arab Emirates. NBAD had the largest market capitalization among UAE banks.

NBAD's line of businesses included a range of retail banking, corporate, wholesale and investment banking, wealth management and private banking; as well as Islamic banking, brokerage, property management and leasing.

In 2015 NBAD set up a regional financial base in India as part of its overseas expansion strategy,

NBAD had regional presence in Kuala Lumpur, Hong Kong and a representative office in Shanghai, China. The bank was also expanding to the South Korean market to expand its presence in Asia.
In October 2012, the bank announced that it is planning to triple its contribution from Islamic banking by introducing sharia-compliant services in Oman and Malaysia.

NBAD's international branch network, the largest among UAE banks, spanned across 17 countries in five continents, from the Far East to Americas.

In December 2016, shareholders approved the bank's plans to merge with the First Gulf Bank (FGB) and both banks finalized the second-tier management by February 2017. The plan to merge the banks, which was first announced in June 2016, will be executed through a share swap, with FGB shareholders receiving 1.254 NBAD shares for each FGB share they hold. The merged entity is now known as First Abu Dhabi Bank and is currently the largest bank in the Middle East and North Africa.

History
NBAD was founded in 1968, the emirate of Abu Dhabi's first bank.

NBAD was the first UAE bank to expand overseas opening a branch in 1975 in Cairo, Egypt In 1976 it expanded into Oman and Sudan, then in 1977 into the United Kingdom the into France and the United States of America in 1979. The bank's network expanded across five continents and 17 countries before its merger.

Ownership
The bank was mostly owned by the Abu Dhabi Investment Council, in December 2013, 70.2% of shares were owned by ADIC and the remaining 21.9% owned by parties including the Government, corporate and private institutions.

International network
NBAD expanded outside the UAE in 1975 with the launch of its branch in Egypt. Before its merger, NBAD had operated in 17 countries through branches, subsidiaries and representative offices. Overall, NBAD had nearly 60 branches and offices outside the UAE; Hong Kong, Malaysia (subsidiary), Oman, Bahrain, Kuwait, Jordan, Egypt, Sudan, Switzerland, through its subsidiary NBAD Private Bank (Suisse) SA, France, UK, the United States through its subsidiary Abu Dhabi International Bank. NBAD also had representative offices in Shanghai, China, São Paulo, Brazil, and Beirut, Lebanon. NBAD had said its growth strategy was based on expansion across the West-East Corridor, which it defined the area stretching from West of Africa to East of Asia. It had further said that it planned to build five international bank franchises across the West-East Corridor.

Islamic banking
Sharia-compliant banking at NBAD was offered through its subsidiary Abu Dhabi National Islamic Finance Company. ADNIF was founded in 2008.

Sponsorships

NBAD served as the Official Bank of Formula One Abu Dhabi Grand Prix, the first time held in Abu Dhabi in 2009, and in the subsequent years: 2010, 2011, 2012, 2013, 2014, 2015, 2016, 2017.

Credit rating
Global Finance, had ranked NBAD for the fifth consecutive year among its ‘World’s 50 Safest Banks’.

On 10 October 2013, Standard & Poor's Ratings Services raised the National Bank of Abu Dhabi 's credit rating based on the strong link with the Government of Abu Dhabi and the important role the bank plays within Abu Dhabi. S&P raised NBAD's long- and short-term counterparty credit ratings on NBAD to 'AA-/A-1+' from 'A+/A-1'. The credit rating agency also affirmed NBAD 's "Stable" outlook.

NBAD was also rated Aa3/P1 by Moody's, AA-/F1+ by Fitch, A+ by Rating and Investment Information Inc (R&I) Japan, and AAA by RAM (Malaysia).

Structure and businesses
In 2013 NBAD Group restructured its business operations into three units:
1.	Global Wholesale
2.	Gulf Retail and Commercial,
3.	Global Wealth

In addition, the Bank had Two Geographies managing the franchise in each country, operating under NBAD's Gulf & International. The Geographies were
1.	Gulf
2.	International

Subsidiaries

Abu Dhabi Capital Markets NYC

Executives
Soon after the announcement of NBAD's merger with First Gulf Bank, NBAD announced that Chief Executive Officer Alex Thursby has stepped down. He was replaced by Abhijit Choudhury as Acting CEO. Choudhury joined NBAD as Chief Risk Officer in December 2006. He was appointed as Acting Group Chief Executive Officer in August 2016. Choudhury's banking career spans nearly 40 years, starting with ANZ Grindlays Bank in India. He continued  to develop a comprehensive knowledge of Mideast markets after 17 years at  the Arab Banking Corporation in Bahrain.

Mr. James Burdett is the Group Chief Financial Officer and was appointed to his role in May 2014.  Mr. Burdett joined NBAD from Australia and New Zealand Banking Group (ANZ) where he served as Chief Financial Officer International and Institutional Banking. Prior to this position, he was Chief Financial Officer Asia Pacific, Europe and America at ANZ.

Board of Directors
NBAD Board of Directors in 2016:
H. E. Nasser Ahmed Alsowaidi, Chairman, Non-executive Director
Sheikh Mohammed Bin Saif Bin Mohammed Al Nahyan, Non-executive Director
Sheikh Ahmed Mohammed Sultan Al Dhaheri, Non-executive Director
Mr. Matar Hamdan Al Ameri, Independent Non-executive Director
H.E. Sultan Bin Rashed Al Dhaheri, Non-executive Director
Mr. Khalifa Sultan Al Suwaidi, Non-executive Director
H.E. Hareb Masood Al Darmaki, Non-executive Director
H.E. Mohammed Omar Abdulla, Non-executive Director
H.E. Sultan Nasser Al Suwaidi, Non-executive Director
Ms. Mariam Saeed Ghobash, Non-executive Director
Mr. Hashim Fawwaz Al Kudsi, Non-executive Director
Mr. David Beau, Independent Non-executive Director

Senior management  
 Abhijit Choudhury - Acting Group Chief Executive Officer
 Abdulla Mohammed Saleh AbdulRaheem - Deputy Group Chief Executive Officer
 Samer Abdelhaq - Senior Managing Director & Group General Counsel - Legal & Compliance Division
 Mahmood Al Aradi - Senior Managing Director & Head of Global Markets
 Khalaf Sultan Bin Rashed Al Dhaheri - Senior Managing Director & Group Chief Operating Officer
 Qamber Ali Al Mulla - Senior Managing Director & CEO of Gulf & International
 Abdulla Bin Khalaf Al Otaiba - Senior Managing Director & Group Head of Global Retail & Commercial
 Saif Al Shehhi - Senior Managing Director - Abu Dhabi Government & VVIP Clients
 James Burdett - Group Chief Financial Officer
 Rudiger Von Wedel - Senior Managing Director of Global Wealth
 Malcolm Walker - Senior Managing Director & Group Chief Audit Officer
 Akram Mark Yassin - Senior Managing Director & Head of Global Banking

References

External links

First Abu Dhabi Bank (FAB) Website

Defunct banks of the United Arab Emirates
Banks established in 1968
Government-owned companies of Abu Dhabi
2016 mergers and acquisitions
Emirati companies established in 1968
Banks disestablished in 2016
2016 disestablishments in the United Arab Emirates